The Riverina Recorder, also published as the Moulamein Times and the Riverina Record, Moulamein Times was a weekly newspaper published in Balranald, New South Wales, Australia from 1877 to 1965.

History
The Riverina Recorder was first published in 1877 and was published weekly until 1 April 1965, when it ceased publication under this name. During this period it was also known as the Riverina recorder, Moulamein times and had been previously titled the Moulamein Times. It was distributed across Balrandald, Oxley, Euston, Moulamein and Swan Hill.

The paper was incorporated into the Swan Hill Guardian. This was renamed in 1971 to The Guardian, which is still in publication.

Digitisation
The paper has been digitised as part of the Australian Newspapers Digitisation Program  of the National Library of Australia.

References

External links
 
 The Guardian (official website)

Defunct newspapers published in New South Wales
Riverina
Newspapers on Trove